Cambio  was a state-funded newspaper published in La Paz, Bolivia. The newspaper began publication on 22 January 2009.

After the resignation of Evo Morales Cambio ceased publications and was replaced by the new newspaper Bolivia.

References

2009 establishments in Bolivia
Mass media in La Paz
Newspapers published in Bolivia
Publications established in 2009
Spanish-language newspapers